Lars Skåål (14 September 1949 – 4 May 2022) was a Swedish water polo player. He competed in the men's tournament at the 1980 Summer Olympics.

References

External links
 

1949 births
2022 deaths
Swedish male water polo players
Olympic water polo players of Sweden
Water polo players at the 1980 Summer Olympics
Sportspeople from Örebro